Debbi is a female personal name, a variant of Debbie.

It may specifically refer to:
 Debbi (singer), a Czech and German singer
Debbi Fields, an American business person who founded Mrs. Fields Bakeries
Debbi Lawrence, an American  racewalker
Debbi Morgan, an American  actress
Debbi Peterson, an American musician who played with The Bangles
Debbi Taylor (formerly Debbi Wrobleski),  an American sports reporter
Debbi Wilkes, a Canadian pair skater.